Milan Đuričić (born 3 August 1945) is a Croatian retired footballer and coach.

He managed hometown club NK Osijek 5 times, succeeding Miljenko Mihić in 1979 for his first stint.

References

External links
 

1945 births
Living people
Footballers from Osijek
Association football wingers
Yugoslav footballers
NK Osijek players
NK Mura players
NK Maribor players
Yugoslav First League players
Yugoslav football managers
Croatian football managers
NK Osijek managers
AS Beauvais Oise managers
DSV Leoben managers
SK Sturm Graz managers
SK Vorwärts Steyr managers
NK Maribor managers
FC DAC 1904 Dunajská Streda managers
NK Croatia Sesvete managers
NK Celje managers
NK Rudar Velenje managers
NK Krško managers
Yugoslav expatriate football managers
Expatriate football managers in France
Yugoslav expatriate sportspeople in France
Croatian expatriate football managers
Expatriate football managers in Austria
Expatriate football managers in Slovenia
Expatriate football managers in Slovakia
Croatian expatriate sportspeople in Austria
Croatian expatriate sportspeople in Slovenia
Croatian expatriate sportspeople in Slovakia